Nurdan Karagöz (born January 25, 1987, Bolu) is a Turkish weightlifter competing in the – 48 kg division.

She won the silver medal at the 2011 European Weightlifting Championships held in Kazan, Russia lifting for bronze medal in the Snatch category and the silver medal for the Clean&Jerk discipline.  At the 2012 European Championships held in Antalya, Turkey, she became silver medalist.

Karagöz represented her country at the 2012 Summer Olympics and ranked 5th.

Achievements

References

External links
International Weightlifting Federation

1987 births
Living people
Turkish female weightlifters
Weightlifters at the 2012 Summer Olympics
Olympic weightlifters of Turkey
Sportspeople from Bolu
World Weightlifting Championships medalists
European Weightlifting Championships medalists
20th-century Turkish sportswomen
21st-century Turkish sportswomen